Teplice is a city in the Ústí nad Labem Region and capital of the Teplice District, Czech Republic.

Teplice may also refer to:

 Teplice District, a district in the Czech Republic
 Teplice nad Metují, a town in Hradec Králové Region (Náchod District), Czech Republic
 Teplice nad Bečvou, a town in the Olomouc Region (Přerov District), Czech Republic

See also
 Toeplitz (disambiguation)
 Toplița (disambiguation)